The Municipal District of Opportunity No. 17 is a municipal district (MD) occupying a remote area in central northern Alberta, Canada. Located in Census Division 17 north of the Town of Athabasca, its municipal office is located in the Hamlet of Wabasca.

History 
The MD of Opportunity No. 17 was established on August 1, 1995 from the former Improvement District No. 17 East (North).

Geography

Communities and localities 
 
The following urban municipalities are surrounded by the MD of Opportunity No. 17.
Cities
none
Towns
none
Villages
none
Summer villages
none

The following hamlets are located within the MD of Opportunity No. 17.
Hamlets
Calling Lake
Red Earth Creek
Sandy Lake or Pelican Mountain (designated place)
Wabasca (also known as Wabasca-Desmarais, location of municipal office)

The following localities are located within the MD of Opportunity No. 17.
Localities 
Calling River
Centre Calling Lake
Chipewyan Lake
Desmarais
North Calling Lake
Peerless Lake
South Calling Lake
Trout Lake

Demographics 

In the 2016 Census of Population conducted by Statistics Canada, the MD of Opportunity No. 17 had a population of 3,181 living in 1,002 of its 1,554 total private dwellings, a  change from its 2011 population of 3,074. The population of the MD is 69.4% First Nations and 10.1% Métis, making it the only predominantly Indigenous MD in Alberta.

The population of the MD of Opportunity No. 17 according to its 2016 municipal census is 2,639, a  change from its 2015 municipal census population of 3,214.

Economy 
The economy of the MD of Opportunity No. 17 includes oil and gas production, forestry, as well as diamond exploration. The municipality also offers the lowest residential tax rate in the Province of Alberta as part of its efforts to attract and retain residents. Tourism is also a growing segment of the economy in the M.D. Calling Lake Provincial Park in the south, along with North Wabasca Lake provide numerous opportunities for outdoor recreation year round.

See also 
List of communities in Alberta
List of municipal districts in Alberta

References

External links 

 
Opportunity